ADNOC Headquarters is a skyscraper office complex located in Abu Dhabi, United Arab Emirates and is the corporate headquarters of the Abu Dhabi National Oil Company (ADNOC).

The building incorporates energy efficiency and sustainable engineering technologies, such as a double skin façade, LED exterior lighting. Designed by HOK, the overall building complex consists of more than 65 floors with an office tower, corniche club, SPC and Crisis Management Centre, a heritage museum and other supporting facilities.

References

Skyscraper office buildings in Abu Dhabi
Buildings and structures under construction in Abu Dhabi